Galesh Kalam-e Leyla Kuh (also Romanized as Gālesh Kalām-e Leylā Kūh; also known as Gālesh Kalām) is a village in Divshal Rural District, in the Central District of Langarud County, Gilan Province, Iran. At the 2006 census, its population was 199, in 59 families.

References 

Populated places in Langarud County